Cagua Volcano is a stratovolcano located in the Philippine province of Cagayan. It is one of the active volcanoes in the Philippines and has erupted twice in recorded history. Its last eruption was in 1907.

Geography 
Cagua is one of the active volcanoes in the Philippines located in the province of Cagayan in the Cagayan Valley Region of northern Luzon in the northernmost part of the Sierra Madre mountain range.

Geology 

Activity of the early Pleistocene erupted basaltic andesite or effusive basalt. The volcano was covered by enormous lava flows from 600,000 to 300,000 years ago. It has seen activity ranging from phreatic eruptions to ash flows.

It has six hot springs.

Eruptive activity 
Two historical eruptions have taken place at the volcano. Activity in 1860 was a largely phreatic eruption though it was possibly followed by a pyroclastic flow. Renewed eruptions took place in October 1907 .

See also
 List of active volcanoes in the Philippines
 List of potentially active volcanoes in the Philippines
 List of inactive volcanoes in the Philippines
 Philippine Institute of Volcanology and Seismology

References

External links
 

Stratovolcanoes of the Philippines
Subduction volcanoes
Volcanoes of Luzon
Mountains of the Philippines
Sierra Madre (Philippines)
Landforms of Cagayan
Active volcanoes of the Philippines
Pleistocene stratovolcanoes
Holocene stratovolcanoes